Gerda Gantz (born 17 December 1915, date of death unknown) was a Romanian fencer. She competed in the women's individual foil event at the 1936 Summer Olympics.

References

External links

1915 births
Year of death missing
Romanian female fencers
Olympic fencers of Romania
Fencers at the 1936 Summer Olympics
Romanian foil fencers